The Batumi Botanical Garden is a 108 hectare area of land 9 km north of the city of Batumi, capital of Autonomous Republic of Adjara, Georgia. Located at the place called Mtsvane Kontskhi ("The Green Cape") on the Black Sea shore, it is one of the largest botanical gardens in the former Soviet Union.

History 
The Batumi Botanical Garden was started by the Russian botanist Andrey Nikolayevich Krasnov (1862-1914), brother of General Pyotr Krasnov, in the 1880s and officially opened on November 3, 1912. He was aided by two skilled gardeners and decorators – the French D’Alphonse and the Georgian Yason Gordeziani. Krasnov died in 1914 and was interred at the garden which still houses his grave and statue.

Under the Soviet Union, the garden was further expanded and developed, since 1925, into a principal institution for the study of Caucasian maritime subtropical cultures.

Currently, the garden consists of nine floristic sectors, those of Caucasian humid subtropics, East Asia, New Zealand, South America, the Himalayas, Mexico, Australia, and of the Mediterranean. The garden collection comprises 2037 taxonomic units of woody plants, including 104 of Caucasian origin.

The Batumi Botanical Garden had formerly been operated by the Georgian Academy of Sciences. Since 2006, it is an independent institution.

See also 
List of botanical gardens

References

External links

Batumi
Tourist attractions in Adjara
Botanical gardens in Georgia (country)
1912 establishments in the Russian Empire